Yaroslav Shkurko (born 8 February 1991) is a Belarusian professional footballer who plays for Rogachev.

References

External links
 
 
 Profile at pressball.by

1991 births
Living people
Belarusian footballers
Association football midfielders
FC Darida Minsk Raion players
FC Energetik-BGU Minsk players
FC Smolevichi players
FC Slavia Mozyr players
FC Naftan Novopolotsk players
FC Belshina Bobruisk players
FC Dnepr Rogachev players